Winslow United Football Club are a football club based in Winslow, Buckinghamshire, England.

History
Winslow United Football Club was formed in 1891. They joined the South Midlands League in 1968. In the 1983–84 season, they reached the second round of the FA Vase. For the 2008–09 season, they were members of the Spartan South Midlands League Division One. However, they withdrew the senior teams from the league prior to the 2009–10 season and continued with a strong youth policy running an U18, U17 and two U16 teams. After one year out the two senior teams under new management restarted the following season (2010–11). The club's youth academy now stretches from under-7s upwards.  Their greatest years were when they won the South Midlands League Division One in 1974/75 and followed that up with a second place in the Premier Division the very next season managed by John Webster.

Ground
Winslow United play their home games at Winslow Sports Club, Elmfields Gate, Winslow, Buckinghamshire, MK18 3JA. Affectionately known as 'The Gate'

Former players
1. Players that have played/managed in the football league or any foreign equivalent to this level (i.e. fully professional league).
2. Players with full international caps.
3. Players that have achieved success in other sports or the media.
Ayden Callaghan
Patrick Callaghan - Club Legend
 Phil Cook - Led the team to cup glory in 2003/04

Honours
South Midlands League Division One
Champions 1974–75
Runners-up 1975–76
Spartan South Midlands League Division Two
Runners-up 2003–04

Records
Best FA Cup performance: Preliminary round, 2020–21 
Best FA Vase performance: Second round, 1983–84

References

External links
Website

Spartan South Midlands Football League
Winslow, Buckinghamshire
Football clubs in Buckinghamshire
Association football clubs established in 1891
1891 establishments in England
Football clubs in England
North Bucks & District Football League